Paul William Barry Marsden (born 18 March 1968) is a British writer, businessman and former politician. He was the Member of Parliament (MP) for Shrewsbury and Atcham from 1997 until 2005. He was most prominently known for his anti-war views and crossing the floor twice (the first to do so since Winston Churchill), from Labour to the Liberal Democrats in 2001 and returning to Labour in 2005. He instructed a solicitor in 2010 to begin action for phone hacking that allegedly took place back in 2003 by a newspaper. In 2012, Marsden was appointed to draft the parliamentary inquiry report into VIP security at the Olympic and Paralympic Games in London. Currently Marsden is Head of Business Intelligence at the construction company MWH Global.

Early life 
Marsden was born in Frodsham in Cheshire to Thomas Darlington Marsden, a distribution manager and Labour councillor and Audrey Stott, a school teacher. He was educated at Helsby High School. Marsden completed a diploma in building studies at Mid-Cheshire College in 1986, but withdrew from completing a civil engineering degree after the first three years at Teesside Polytechnic in 1990. Studying part-time, he passed a diploma in management at the Open University and a diploma in business excellence at Newcastle College.

Before his political career, Marsden worked as a quality manager at Taylor Woodrow (1990–1994), a management consultant at NatWest Bank (1994–1996) and as a total quality facilitator at Mitel from 1996 until the general election in 1997.

Labour Member of Parliament 
Marsden was elected as the first (and thus far only) Labour MP for Shrewsbury and Atcham at the 1997 general election with a swing of 11.4%; a seat which he held at the 2001 election with a further swing of 5.5%. At 29 years of age, he was one of the youngest MPs elected in 1997. He spoke in the Commons for the first time on 21 May 1997 and in an otherwise traditional maiden speech, joked prophetically about refusing to be intimidated by the Whips. He was nominated to serve on the Agriculture Select Committee and remained for four years quietly serving on the committee.

On 14 April 1999, Marsden introduced the Cancer Care Bill with backing from cancer charities including Macmillan Cancer Support, under the Ten Minute Rule that would create the first comprehensive directory of cancer services in the UK to aid patients in identifying the location and type of cancer care available. The Bill prompted Ruth Fermor Allan to create such a directory called Cancer Care 2000, which was published by Cambridge Healthcare Publishing Ltd in November 2000.

In March 2001, Marsden with cross party support put forward a Doorstep Recycling Bill, mandating the collection of recyclable materials from streets. The Bill was backed by Friends of the Earth. The Bill did not succeed that year but the Government eventually backed a similar Bill by Joan Ruddock and the Municipal Waste Recycling Bill was passed in October 2003, increasing the levels of recycling of residential waste.

After a first term loyally supporting the Government, Marsden began to question the Labour Government's foreign policy following 9/11. On 8 October 2001, he was the first MP in the Commons to publicly call for a vote on any military action in Afghanistan. Marsden took to sitting in Tony Benn's former Commons seat below the gangway on the second row from the back. Two weeks later, Marsden was instructed to attend a meeting with the Labour Chief Whip, Hilary Armstrong. As Jeremy Paxman wrote, "the Labour MP Paul Marsden took the unprecedented step of recording the dressing-down", where he said that he had been confronted with accusations that "those aren't with us are against us," "war is not a matter of conscience" and "it was people like you who appeased Hitler in 1938", infuriating Marsden to going public.

Tony Benn described in his diary that "The pressure on the anti-war MPs is growing. Apparently Paul Marsden had three-quarters-of-an-hour being bullied by the Chief Whip, Hilary Armstrong."
Number 10 were forced to put out a statement that dissenting backbenchers would be allowed to speak out on the war. The Guardian in its Leader praised Marsden for having called for a vote on the war and publishing the Chief Whip's response to it and stated, "On both counts he has done British democracy a service."

Undeterred by the Whip's criticism, Marsden then spoke out against the press officer Jo Moore who had said, that 9/11 was "a very good day to get out anything we want to bury"; he and Tam Dalyell were the only two Labour MPs to vote against the Government.

In November 2001, Marsden visited Pakistan and the Afghan border to highlight the plight of Afghan refugees living in camps who had fled the war. Marsden also negotiated the release of Sunday Telegraph journalist Christina Lamb and photographer Justin Sutcliffe, who had been arrested and held by the Pakistan Police and Inter-Services Intelligence secret service. Christina Lamb thanked Marsden in the acknowledgements of her biographical book, The Sewing Circles of Herat, "Paul Marsden MP for Shrewsbury, helped rescue us from the ISI, being manhandled by Baluchistan police in the process, and kindly rearranged his whole schedule to stay in Pakistan until we were safely out."

On 18 November 2001, Marsden was one of the leaders of the Stop the War demonstration against the war in Afghanistan in London. Marsden was one of the principal speakers along with Tony Benn and George Galloway in Trafalgar Square with 100,000 protesters. He accused Blair of being "drunk with power" and "we are not simply going to allow the atrocities of September 11 to be replaced with further atrocities in Afghanistan".

Marsden complained bitterly that he had been subjected to late night physical attacks by some Labour Whips, which were vigorously denied. Five days later, he defected to the Liberal Democrats on 10 December 2001, citing his disagreements with Labour whips over his opposition to military action in Afghanistan and the resulting civilian casualties. The Big Issue magazine's readers voted Marsden 'Hero of the Year' in 2001 for his opposition to the war in Afghanistan.

Liberal Democrat MP and spokesperson 
In May 2002, Marsden was promoted to junior Health spokesperson for the Liberal Democrats reporting to Evan Harris, in charge of a portfolio covering mental health, prison health and aspects of cancer care.

In June 2002, Marsden presented the Prescriptions (Chronic Diseases) Bill, which aimed to introduce a fairer system for issuing prescriptions' exemptions for patients with acute conditions. Although the Bill received cross party support it ran out of parliamentary time before the summer recess. The Bill received backing from the Cystic Fibrosis Trust and the National Asthma Campaign.

In August 2002 he visited Malawi to turn the media spotlight on the southern African famine and later he travelled to Johannesburg to lobby the United Nations conference discussing the famine affecting Southern Africa. His accusations that the failures of the International Monetary Fund had exacerbated the famine caused a public argument with the IMF Director.

In February 2003, prior to the Iraq War, he visited the USA to give a speaking tour opposing the impending war and laid a Union flag and wreath in commemoration of the victims of the September 11, 2001 attacks at Ground Zero. He also attended the United Nations Security Council session considering the looming war on 14 February. Marsden strongly opposed the war in Iraq and repeatedly voted for an inquiry into the alleged intelligence failings and concerns that parliament was misled.

On the second anniversary of 9/11, he visited the Slobodan Milosevic trial in The Hague and met with prosecution lawyers at the International Criminal Court.

Marsden was declared the leading rebel on all parliamentary votes by The Times in 2003.

In October 2003, Marsden was appointed the number two behind John Thurso as Transport spokesperson for the Liberal Democrats and nominated as a member of the Transport Select Committee.

In April 2004, Marsden set the fifth fastest time for MPs completing the London Marathon out of forty two that have taken part since it began in 1981, with a time of 3 hours 18 minutes 1 second.

On 26 August 2004, Marsden became one of only twenty cross party MPs to back the Impeach Blair campaign with the aim of holding Blair to account over the highly controversial war in Iraq. The campaign used legal counsel for advice but was unable to secure enough support for progressing the impeachment in parliament.

Announces retirement as MP and rejoins Labour 
In July 2004 Marsden announced that he was retiring from politics and would not contest the May 2005 general election. He cited the toll suffered as a result of admissions about his private life and the effects on his family. He reduced his Liberal Democrat political duties and on 5 April 2005, within hours of the start of the election campaign, Marsden announced his intention to rejoin the Labour Party, stating that although he still disagreed with the government over the war and levels of investment in public services, he did not want Labour MPs, who shared his views, to lose their seats. He later apologised to Liberal Democrat supporters for leaving the party. He was the first British politician since Winston Churchill to re-cross the floor of the House of Commons and return to his original party, in Marsden's case to sit on the Labour benches.

During his Parliamentary career Marsden raised over £10K for local and international charities through sponsored marathon running, abseiling and swimming.

In the 2005 general election the Conservative, Daniel Kawczynski won back the Shrewsbury and Atcham seat from the subsequent Labour candidate, Michael Ion.

Expenses 
Although MPs expenses were published after Marsden had left parliament, expenses claims were backdated to the time when he was a sitting MP. Sir Thomas Legg gave Marsden a clean bill of health and reported that he was one of only a minority of MPs and ex-MPs with "no issues".

Post-Parliamentary career 
Before retiring from politics, Marsden co-authored the book Voices for Peace published by Simon & Schuster in 2001. Four years later he researched and published a local history book, The Blackfriars of Shrewsbury and returned to business consultancy in 2005.  He also wrote more anti-war poetry.

In December 2005, Marsden caused a row when he publicly confirmed Charles Kennedy's drinking problems and that Kennedy had not been telling the truth about his illness. Kennedy's press secretary vehemently denied Marsden's story. However, by 5 January 2006, Kennedy admitted he had "a drink problem" and had sought "professional help". He resigned two days later as leader.

In 2007, Marsden was appointed Director of Policy at the British Union for the Abolition of Vivisection and between 2008 and 2010 was the CEO of the Painting and Decorating Association.

In May 2009, Marsden applied to rejoin the Labour Party but was provisionally blocked by the National Executive and is not presently a member of any political party.

In September 2010, Marsden's war poem, Eighty at Ligny was used in l'exposition historique for the British World War I war cemetery in memory of the eighty British, Irish and Canadian soldiers who are buried in Ligny-sur-Canche. In 2010, Marsden returned to business consultancy, working as a consultant for a trade conference.

In January 2011, it was reported that Marsden had commenced legal enquiries into allegations of hacking into his phone back in 2003. A suspended reporter who worked at the Sunday Mirror and then the News of the World was claimed to be involved. A Channel 4 Dispatches programme interviewed Marsden and it was revealed that the reporter in question, had been suspended for phone hacking, although he denied it. It was the first time that a newspaper other than the News of the World had been cited in connection with allegations of phone hacking.

In May 2011, Marsden wrote on his Blog, www.paulwbmarsden.blogspot.com, an article about the debate on public interest vs privacy in which he mentioned the allegations that Ryan Giggs was the footballer who had taken out a super injunction against Imogen Thomas. His Blog was written before John Hemming revealed the Manchester United player's name under parliamentary privilege.

In July 2012, Marsden was appointed as a consultant to the All Party Parliamentary Group on Specialist Security and was employed to draft the inquiry report on VIP Security at the Olympic and Paralympic Games in London.

In 2019 Marsden joined the TransPennine Route Upgrade Alliance as Business Systems Manager.

References

External links
 Paul Marsden's Blog
 Paul Marsden MPs website
 Paul Marsden Public Whip voting record
 Guardian Politics Ask Aristotle Paul Marsden
 BBC Profile of Paul Marsden
 Record in Parliament for Paul Marsden
 Paul Marsden on Twitter
 Hansard 1803–2005: Contributions in Parliament by Paul Marsden

1968 births
English Anglicans
Living people
Liberal Democrats (UK) MPs for English constituencies
Labour Party (UK) MPs for English constituencies
People from Frodsham
Politics of Shropshire
Alumni of Teesside University
Alumni of the Open University
UK MPs 1997–2001
UK MPs 2001–2005
Members of the Parliament of the United Kingdom for constituencies in Shropshire